Mrs Gibbs, a stage-name, may refer to:

Maria Gibbs (fl. 1783–1844), a British actress
Margaretta Graddon (born 1804), a British popular singer.